Sar Ghol (also known as Sar Qol) is a village in Bahmayi-ye Sarhadi-ye Sharqi Rural District, Dishmok District, Kohgiluyeh County, Kohgiluyeh and Boyer-Ahmad Province, Iran. In the 2006 census, its population was 196, which included 40 families.

References 

Populated places in Kohgiluyeh County